South River is a borough in Middlesex County, in the U.S. state of New Jersey. As of the 2020 United States census, the borough's population was 16,118, an increase of 110 (+0.7%) from the 2010 census count of 16,008, which in turn reflected an increase of 686 (+4.5%) from the 15,322 counted in the 2000 census.

What is now South River was originally formed as the town of Washington within East Brunswick Township on February 23, 1870. South River was incorporated as an independent borough by an act of the New Jersey Legislature on February 28, 1898, replacing Washington town. It was named after the Raritan River's South River tributary, which marks the borough's eastern and northeastern boundary.

History

South River was originally part of East Brunswick Township. Originally referred to as Washington, the community eventually split away as did Spotswood and Milltown.

From 1683 to 1720, the area was commonly referred to as South River Landing. In 1720, the name Willettstown was adopted after settler Samuel Willett. In 1784, the name was changed to Washington and the area was variously referred to as Washington Village, Washington Woods, and Little Washington. The name was considered at the suggestion of Abraham Barkelew, one of the original settlers in the town. In 1870, the name was changed to South River and on February 28, 1898, South River officially became a borough.

Geography
According to the United States Census Bureau, the borough had a total area of 2.94 square miles (7.61 km2), including 2.79 square miles (7.21 km2) of land and 0.16 square miles (0.40 km2) of water (5.27%).

The borough borders the Middlesex County communities of East Brunswick and Sayreville.

Unincorporated communities, localities and place names located partially or completely within the borough include Newton Heights, which is situated along the border of South River and East Brunswick.

Demographics

2010 census

The Census Bureau's 2006–2010 American Community Survey showed that (in 2010 inflation-adjusted dollars) median household income was $62,284 (with a margin of error of +/− $9,691) and the median family income was $78,109 (+/− $8,122). Males had a median income of $51,599 (+/− $6,269) versus $46,014 (+/− $3,025) for females. The per capita income for the borough was $28,178 (+/− $1,766). About 4.4% of families and 6.6% of the population were below the poverty line, including 6.9% of those under age 18 and 10.1% of those age 65 or over.

2000 census
As of the 2000 United States census there were 15,322 people, 5,606 households, and 3,985 families residing in the borough. The population density was 5,444.7 people per square mile (2,105.3/km2). There were 5,769 housing units at an average density of 2,050.0 per square mile (792.7/km2). The racial makeup of the borough was 83.55% White, 9.66% Hispanic or Latino, 6.06% African American, 0.12% Native American, 3.54% Asian, 0.05% Pacific Islander, 3.83% from other races, and 2.85% from two or more races.

Most common ancestries of the population are Polish (18.9%), Italian (14.6%), Irish (13.0%), German (12.5%), Portuguese (9.3%), Russian (4.5%).

There were 5,606 households, out of which 32.3% had children under the age of 18 living with them, 55.2% were married couples living together, 11.1% had a female householder with no husband present, and 28.9% were non-families. 23.3% of all households were made up of individuals, and 11.4% had someone living alone who was 65 years of age or older. The average household size was 2.72 and the average family size was 3.23.

In the borough the population was spread out, with 23.0% under the age of 18, 8.4% from 18 to 24, 33.4% from 25 to 44, 20.7% from 45 to 64, and 14.6% who were 65 years of age or older. The median age was 36 years. For every 100 females, there were 97.8 males. For every 100 females age 18 and over, there were 95.7 males.

The median income for a household in the borough was $52,324, and the median income for a family was $62,869. Males had a median income of $42,186 versus $31,098 for females. The per capita income for the borough was $23,684. About 3.7% of families and 4.9% of the population were below the poverty line, including 3.9% of those under age 18 and 7.3% of those age 65 or over.

A large Polish, Russian, and Portuguese immigrant population moved into the borough in the 1950s-1980s. Today South River's largest incoming immigrant population are Asian, Mexican and Brazilian populations.

Belarusians in South River

South River has become a center for Belarusian Americans in the postwar-period.

The first immigrants from present-day Belarus (from the areas of modern-day western Minsk Voblast and Hrodna Voblast, around the towns of Vilejka, Maladziečna and others) arrived to South River in the late 19th century. Most of the immigrants of that time identified themselves as Polish or Russian depending on their faith. Immigrants from Belarus established a Roman Catholic church of Our Lady of the Gate of Dawn (a prominent Catholic icon in Vilnius venerated primarily by Catholics in Western Belarus and Lithuania) and a 250 members strong Russian Orthodox parish of St. Peter and St. Paul.

The postwar immigrants founded the Belarusian Congress Committee of America here in 1951. In the 1950s they reestablished the Belarusian Orthodox parish of St. Eufrasinnia, that previously existed in Germany. A Belarusian cemetery was opened in 1953, that houses also Radasłaŭ Astroŭski.

Government

Local government
South River is governed under the Borough form of New Jersey municipal government, which is used in 218 municipalities (of the 564) statewide, making it the most common form of government in New Jersey. The governing body is comprised of the Mayor and the Borough Council, with all positions elected at-large on a partisan basis as part of the November general election. A Mayor is elected directly by the voters to a four-year term of office. The Borough Council is comprised of six members elected to serve three-year terms on a staggered basis, with two seats coming up for election each year in a three-year cycle. The Borough form of government used by South River is a "weak mayor / strong council" government in which council members act as the legislative body with the mayor presiding at meetings and voting only in the event of a tie. The mayor can veto ordinances subject to an override by a two-thirds majority vote of the council. The mayor makes committee and liaison assignments for council members, and most appointments are made by the mayor with the advice and consent of the council.

, the mayor of South River is Republican John M. Krenzel, whose term of office ends December 31, 2023. Members of the Borough Council are Council President Anthony Ciulla (R, 2022), Donna Balazs (R, 2022), Peter S. Giundi (R, 2024), James Gurchensky (R, 2023), Julie R. Meira (D, 2023) and Jason Oliveira (R, 2024).

In January 2014, the borough council selected former councilmember Michael Trenga from among three names nominated by the Republican municipal committee to fill the nearly three years remaining on the vacant seat of John Trzeciak, who cited personal reasons in resigning from office just weeks after taking his seat on the council. In the November 2014 general election, Trenga was elected to serve the balance of the term of office.

Federal, state and county representation
South River is located in the 12th Congressional District and is part of New Jersey's 18th state legislative district

 

Middlesex County is governed by a Board of County Commissioners, whose seven members are elected at-large on a partisan basis to serve three-year terms of office on a staggered basis, with either two or three seats coming up for election each year as part of the November general election. At an annual reorganization meeting held in January, the board selects from among its members a commissioner director and deputy director. , Middlesex County's Commissioners (with party affiliation, term-end year, and residence listed in parentheses) are 
Commissioner Director Ronald G. Rios (D, Carteret, term as commissioner ends December 31, 2024; term as commissioner director ends 2022),
Commissioner Deputy Director Shanti Narra (D, North Brunswick, term as commissioner ends 2024; term as deputy director ends 2022),
Claribel A. "Clary" Azcona-Barber (D, New Brunswick, 2022),
Charles Kenny (D, Woodbridge Township, 2022),
Leslie Koppel (D, Monroe Township, 2023),
Chanelle Scott McCullum (D, Piscataway, 2024) and 
Charles E. Tomaro (D, Edison, 2023).
Constitutional officers are
County Clerk Nancy Pinkin (D, 2025, East Brunswick),
Sheriff Mildred S. Scott (D, 2022, Piscataway) and 
Surrogate Claribel Cortes (D, 2026; North Brunswick).

Politics
As of March 2011, there were a total of 7,901 registered voters in South River, of which 2,520 (31.9%) were registered as Democrats, 1,186 (15.0%) were registered as Republicans and 4,193 (53.1%) were registered as Unaffiliated. There were 2 voters registered as Libertarians or Greens.

In the 2012 presidential election, Democrat Barack Obama received 58.5% of the vote (3,033 cast), ahead of Republican Mitt Romney with 40.5% (2,101 votes), and other candidates with 1.0% (52 votes), among the 5,233 ballots cast by the borough's 8,095 registered voters (47 ballots were spoiled), for a turnout of 64.6%. In the 2008 presidential election, Democrat Barack Obama received 54.9% of the vote (3,148 cast), ahead of Republican John McCain with 42.5% (2,434 votes) and other candidates with 1.7% (95 votes), among the 5,729 ballots cast by the borough's 8,078 registered voters, for a turnout of 70.9%. In the 2004 presidential election, Democrat John Kerry received 51.8% of the vote (2,763 ballots cast), outpolling Republican George W. Bush with 46.1% (2,460 votes) and other candidates with 0.8% (63 votes), among the 5,331 ballots cast by the borough's 7,591 registered voters, for a turnout percentage of 70.2.

In the 2013 gubernatorial election, Republican Chris Christie received 63.8% of the vote (1,997 cast), ahead of Democrat Barbara Buono with 35.0% (1,094 votes), and other candidates with 1.2% (39 votes), among the 3,163 ballots cast by the borough's 8,146 registered voters (33 ballots were spoiled), for a turnout of 38.8%. In the 2009 gubernatorial election, Republican Chris Christie received 53.2% of the vote (1,916 ballots cast), ahead of  Democrat Jon Corzine with 38.2% (1,378 votes), Independent Chris Daggett with 6.5% (235 votes) and other candidates with 0.9% (32 votes), among the 3,604 ballots cast by the borough's 7,787 registered voters, yielding a 46.3% turnout.

Education
The South River Public Schools serve students in pre-kindergarten through twelfth grade. As of the 2020–21 school year, the district, comprised of four schools, had an enrollment of 2,325 students and 203.0 classroom teachers (on an FTE basis), for a student–teacher ratio of 11.5:1.

The district is classified by the New Jersey Department of Education as being in District Factor Group "CD", the sixth-highest of eight groupings. District Factor Groups organize districts statewide to allow comparison by common socioeconomic characteristics of the local districts. From lowest socioeconomic status to highest, the categories are A, B, CD, DE, FG, GH, I and J.

Schools
Schools in the district (with 2020–21 enrollment data from the National Center for Education Statistics) are 
South River Primary School with 399 students in grades PreK-1, 
South River Elementary School with 655 students in grades 2-5, 
South River Middle School with 511 students in grades 6-8 and 
South River High School with 722 students in grades 9-12.

Transportation

Roads and highways

The mains roads that travel through are CR 527 and CR 535. Route 18 passes just west of the borough, which provides access to the New Jersey Turnpike (Interstate 95).

Public transportation
NJ Transit bus service is provided on the 811 and 815 routes.

Notable people

People who were born in, residents of, or otherwise closely associated with South River include:

 Radasłaŭ Astroŭski (1887–1976), Belarusian political leader and Nazi Collaborator 
 George Brasno (1911–1982), vaudevillian performer known for his appearances alongside his sister Olive in the Our Gang comedies and Charlie Chan movie series
 Olive Brasno (1917–1998), vaudevillian performer known for her appearances in the Our Gang comedies and Charlie Chan movie series
 Joseph Csatari (born 1929), painter
 Janet Evanovich (born 1943), author
 John H. Froude (born 1930), politician who served in the New Jersey General Assembly from 1972 to 1980
 Angelica Generosa, ballet dancer who is a principal dancer with the Pacific Northwest Ballet
 Lyle Goodhue (1903–1981), scientist
 Kenny Jackson (born 1962), former professional football player
 Jonathan Janson (born 1950), painter
 Stanley Kamel (1943–2008), actor who performed in the USA Network series Monk as Dr. Charles Kroger
 Barys Kit (1910–2018), Belarusian-American rocket scientist
 Evan Louro (born 1996), soccer player who plays as a goalkeeper for the New York Red Bulls in Major League Soccer
 Melbourne MacDowell (1856–1941), stage and silent screen actor, when the borough was still known as Little Washington
 Frank Mula (1950–2021), writer for The Simpsons
 Alfred Nisonoff (1923–2001), immunology researcher
 Drew Pearson (born 1951), former professional football player
 Brian Sicknick (1978–2021), officer of the United States Capitol Police who died following the January 6 United States Capitol attack
 Pete Sivess (1913–2003), pitcher for the Philadelphia Phillies
 Elmer Stout (1929–2013), football player
 Joe Susan (born 1955), former head coach of the Bucknell Bison football team and current Special Assistant to The Head Football Coach at Rutgers University
 Joe Theismann (born 1949), former professional football player
 Alex Wojciechowicz (1915–1992), professional football player
 Russell Zavistovich (1928–2000), leader of the Belarusian American community

In popular culture 
Rescue 911 (Season 3, Episode 25) features a segment about a Good Samaritan who assisted in the rescue of an occupant from an apartment fire on January 8, 1991, at the Emess Apartments (now known as Deer Creek Village).

References

External links

 South River Borough

 
1898 establishments in New Jersey
Borough form of New Jersey government
Boroughs in Middlesex County, New Jersey
Populated places established in 1898